Strzeszów may refer to the following places in Poland:
Strzeszów, Lower Silesian Voivodeship (south-west Poland)
Strzeszów, West Pomeranian Voivodeship (north-west Poland)